Several ships of the French navy have borne the name Faucon:
 Faucon (1638), broken up in 1661
 Faucon (1674), broken up in 1708
 Faucon (1728), a brig
 Faucon (1759), a cutter
  (1887), a destroyer, withdrawn from service 1920

See also  
 Faucon (disambiguation)

French Navy ship names